The AACTA Award for Best Reality Television Series is an award presented by the Australian Academy of Cinema and Television Arts (AACTA), a non-profit organisation whose aim is to "identify, award, promote and celebrate Australia's greatest achievements in film and television." The award is presented at the annual AACTA Awards, which hand out accolades for achievements in feature film, television, documentaries and short films. The award was first introduced in 2012, for the 2nd AACTA Awards in 2013, due to the growth of reality television productions in Australia. Reality television productions could previously be submitted in the Best Light Entertainment Series category.

To be eligible, the production being submitted must: be significantly non-scripted; "involve participants being placed in an environment or format in which the premise, circumstances or situations they encounter are manipulated for the purposes of creating the program"; be no less than four episodes of at least half an hour in length; not be a news, current affairs, light entertainment or documentary series; and not be a production that requires a producer to set up a situation "that is then observed with minimal further intervention by the producers". The winner of the award is the producer of the program.

Masterchef Australia has received six wins from ten nominations, more than any other program. Programs from the Network 10 have received the most nominations with 18. Network 10 have received the most overall wins, with eight.

Winners and nominees

References

External links
 Official website of the Australian Academy of Cinema and Television Arts

Television
Awards established in 2013
2013 establishments in Australia